Thamen Chai railway station is a railway station located in Thamen Chai Subdistrict, Lam Plai Mat District, Buriram Province.

References 

Railway stations in Thailand
Buriram province